Abdulrahman bin Abdulmohsen Al-Fadhli (Arabic: عبد الرحمن بن عبد المحسن الفضلي) is the Saudi Minister of Environment, Water and Agriculture who was appointed in January 2015. He holds a bachelor's degree in chemical engineering from King Saud University.

Career 
Al-Fadhli worked years in the petroleum industries sector before becoming the general manager of Almarai food company. In 2000, he was promoted to be the CEO of Almarai. He chaired the board of director of other companies.

Al-Fadhli also is the board chairman of several institutions including the National Water Company, the Saudi Grains Organization, the Agriculture Development Fund, the Saudi Wildlife Authority, and the General Authority of Meteorology and Environment Protection.

References 

Living people
Year of birth missing (living people)
Agriculture ministers of Saudi Arabia
Environment ministers of Saudi Arabia
Water ministers of Saudi Arabia